The sixth season of the CBS police procedural drama series Hawaii Five-0 premiered on Friday, September 25, 2015, and concluded on May 13, 2016. It contained 25 episodes.

Cast and characters

Main cast
 Alex O'Loughlin as Lieutenant Commander Steven "Steve" McGarrett, United States Navy Reserve Five-O Task Force
 Scott Caan as Detective Sergeant Daniel "Danny" "Danno" Williams, Honolulu Police Department, Five-O Task Force
 Daniel Dae Kim as Detective Lieutenant Chin Ho Kelly, Honolulu Police Department, Five-O Task Force
 Grace Park as Officer Kono Kalakaua, Honolulu Police Department, Five-O Task Force
 Masi Oka as Dr. Max Bergman, Chief Medical Examiner
 Chi McBride as Captain Lou Grover, Honolulu Police Department, Five-O Task Force
 Jorge Garcia as Jerry Ortega, Special Consultant, Five-O Task Force

Recurring

Guest stars

Episodes

Production
On May 11, 2015, the series was renewed for a sixth season. Filming began on July 8, 2015, with a traditional Hawaiian blessing.

Reception

Ratings

References

External links
 
 
 List of Hawaii Five-0 episodes at The Futon Critic
 

2015 American television seasons
2016 American television seasons
Hawaii Five-0 (2010 TV series) seasons